Mahuri (माहुरी) is a Hindu caste (jāti) under Vaishya varna.
Mahuri are reported to have migrated from the city of Mathura and surrounding rural locations to the then sub of Bengal under the Mughal Empire. As a faithful community, the Mahuri Vaishya community still continues to worship Mata Mathurasini Devi, an incarnation of Shakti, as their family deity.

Mythology 
In a part of the Bhagavata Purana, which is named Sukha Sagar (that is, the Ocean of Bliss), there is a mythical story which states that Brahma felt that the Avatar (incarnation) of Krishna had already taken place on the earth (Prithvi). He dispatched an emissary to the Mathura region to ascertain the factual position. There the emissary found that Krishna was moving around with Gopas and Gopis in and around Vrindavan. After some time, Krishna went somewhere, leaving the Gopas and Gopis alone for some time. During Krishna's absence, Brahma's emissary put all the Gopas and Gopis inside a cave and closed the opening of the cave. Upon his return, when Krishna found that all the Gopas and Gopis had disappeared, he, by his divine power, created duplicates of them and sent them to their respective homes.

After some time, the real Gopas and Gopis could come out of the cave, and when they reached their homes, they found their identical figures occupying the houses. Somehow, they evicted them from their houses. Now, the Gopas and Gopis created of Krishna's divine maya came to him, and prayed for shelter. Krishna advised them to reside in the fourteen forest hamlets around Vrindavan and directed them that for livelihood they should engage themselves in trade and commerce.

It is believed by some of the Mahuri people that these Gopas and Gopis created by the divine Maya of Krishna are their ancestors, and Mahuri people derive their surnames, as described below, from the names of the forest hamlets where they had originally settled as directed by Krishna.

Surnames  

The Mahuri Vaishya have 13 surnames (family names), each with a different gotra.

It is believed that Lord Krishna advised the ancient ancestors of the Mahuri to engage themselves in trade and commerce—that is, to take up the ways of the Vaishya—in order to earn their livelihood. They settled in fourteen hamlets nestled in the forests of Vrindavana (now Vrindavan) around the ancient city of Mathura, whence the name "Mahuri". The fourteen original Mahuri surnames or family names (referred to by modern Mahuri Vaishya as "khatas") are derived from the names of these forest hamlets.'''Athghara (अठघरा) - "Athghara" khata is derived from "khelvan" which is believed to be the lila-ashali of Lord Krishan and Radha. A pond named "Mansarovar" was believed to be located in the "khelwan". "Chandra muni" is the gotra of Athghara.Bargawe (बड़गवे) - Bargawe derives their Khata from "bahulavana". Krishan-Kunda and temples of Baldeojee and Bahula cow are located here. The gotra of Bargawe is "Kanta muni".Barahpuriya (बरहपुरिया) - Barahpuriyas derive their khata from "madhuwan" where their ancestors used to reside. In this place, one king by the name of Brihat Sen is reported to have performed yagya under the priesthood of Shanta rishi. It is believed that the children performed Yagya. It is believed that "Barahpuriyas" are descendants of "baraha-sainis". The gotra of "Barahpuriya" is "vashista muni" gotra.Bhadani (भदानी) surname was acquired by the families who lived in the hamlet of Bhadrawana. Bhadanis belong to Kusha Muni gotra. (This name is also used by some other social groups in the Indian Subcontinent, but often with a modified spelling - e.g. Badani.)Charanpahari (चरणपहाड़ी) - In Vrindavana area, there are 5 hillocks, Gowardhan, Varasatu, Nandishawar, Charanpahari and Dushari Charanpahari. These small mountains gave the Khata "Charanpahari". The gotra of "charanpahari" is "Saravesh muni".Ekghara - From the "vatsha-vana", Lord Brahama is reported to have stolen some calves. Here, Gwal Mandol and Haribole's thirties are located. It is believed that "Ekghara" families used to reside in "vatsha-vana". "Chandra muni" is the gotra of "Ekghara".Kandhwe (कंधवे) Kandhwe is given to those families who lived in the hamlet of Kaamvana. Kandhwes belong to the gotra of Kashyap muni.
Kapsime (कपसीमे) - Kapsime is derived from the "mudvan". Here, there is the shrine of prabhujee. The gotra of Kapsime is  muni" and "Kapil muni"Kutariyar (कुटरियार) - Families residing in the "bhandeervana" acquired "Kutariyaar" khata. A well by the name "Bhandeer" is here. It is believed that this well appeared when the lord Krishan annihilated the demon "vatasha-ashur". "Sharan muni" is perhaps the gotra of "kutariyaar" Some people in this gotra also have their title as "Ram".Lohani (लोहानी) is given to families who lived in the hamlet of Lohawana (near the cave of the demon Lohasur). Lohani folks were initiated in the school of "kapila Muni" and accordingly their gotra is "kapil muni".Pawanchaudah (पवनचौदह)- The temple of "pawan mohan jee" is located in Mahavan. Families residing in this area derived the Khata "Pawanchaudah". The gotra of "Pawanchaudah" is "Surya muni".Seth (सेठ) - Those families who were residing in "viharvana" acquired the khata "seth". Presently, there stands a magnificent temple built by Jaipur King Shree Madawajee. "Kamal muni" is the gotra of "Seth" Khata.Tarwe (तरवे) is given to those families who lived in the hamlet of Talwan. Tarwes belong to "Vatasa muni" gotra. In the talwan, Shri Balaramjee is reported to have killed a demon by the name of 'Dhenuka-asur".Vaishkiyar (वैश्कियार) - Families residing in the "brihatvana" derived the khata "Vaishkiyar". This "brihatvana" was reportedly located on the eastern flank of "lohavana" where "Nimbakacharya" is believed to have appeared. "Vaishkiyar" belongs to "Bhardwaj muni" gotra.Aramram (आरामराम) Barbigahiya (बरबिगहिया)'''

History

Although Mahuri people have been coming to places in the Suba of Bengal during the heyday of the Mughal Empire (around 500 years before) for trade and commerce, the large waves of migrations reportedly took place around 250 years before. Scores of families reached the place Bihar-E-Sharif located in the present day state of Bihar, India. Over a period of several decades, the Mahuri Vaishya folks reached the hinterland of Chota Nagpur Plateau (or Chhota Nagpur) and got located in a number of villages.

Before this, they had already settled in several fertile locations of the areas of the Magadha. Ultimately, the heritage city of Gaya, in several senses, emerged as the "capital city" of all the Mahuri Vaishya people. From the early 20th Century, several mahuri families migrated to the places located in the present day states of the West Bengal Jharkhand Chhattisgarh and Odisha. By the end of the last century, the dynamism of the Mahuri Vaishya took them to several parts of India, particularly to the metropolitan cities of Calcutta, New Delhi and Mumbai. A number of them have also shed their traditional vocation of trade and commerce, and are engaged in a variety of other professions.

See also
 Bhadani Nagar
 Vinodini Tarway

External links 
 Mahuri

Indian castes
Bania communities
Social groups of Bihar
Social groups of India
People from Mathura